Copelatus mulangensis is a species of diving beetle. It is part of the genus Copelatus, which is in the subfamily Copelatinae of the family Dytiscidae. It was described by Bameul in 2003.

References

mulangensis
Beetles described in 2003